John Curulewski (October 3, 1950 – February 13, 1988) was an American musician who was one of the original members of Styx.

Career 
In 1969 Curulewski joined the Chicago-based band TW4, featuring college friends Dennis DeYoung, Chuck Panozzo, and John Panozzo. The group evolved into Styx by 1972. Curulewski played guitar and sang occasional lead vocals on the band's first five studio albums, released from 1972 to 1975. Just after the recording of the album Equinox in 1975, Curulewski left Styx to spend more time with his family, and was replaced by Tommy Shaw.

After his career with Styx, Curulewski became a guitar teacher in the Chicago area and played occasionally in local bands. He died on February 13, 1988, from a brain aneurysm. He was survived by his wife and their son.

References

1950 births
1988 deaths
American rock guitarists
American male guitarists
Styx (band) members
20th-century American musicians
Deaths from intracranial aneurysm
Guitarists from Chicago
20th-century American guitarists
20th-century American male musicians